SBD may refer to:

 Douglas SBD Dauntless, a World War II American naval scout plane and dive bomber
 San Bernardino International Airport, airport identifier code SBD
 Savings Bank of Danbury, a bank headquartered in Connecticut
 Schottky barrier diode
 Seaboard System Railroad, reporting mark SBD
 Secure by design, in software engineering, the principle of designing a program from the ground up to be secure
 Sell By Date, see Shelf life
 Sentence boundary disambiguation a natural language processing problem
 Short Burst Data, a communication protocol for the Iridium-Modem
 Silent but deadly, a term in Great Britain to describe a silent but pungent fart
  Silent but Deadly, a 2011 movie
 Smart Battery Data, a method for monitoring a rechargeable battery pack
 Solomon Islands dollar, ISO 4217 currency code
 Soundboard (disambiguation), multiple meanings
 Abbreviation for the southbound direction of travel
 Stanley Black & Decker, an American manufacturer of industrial tools and household hardware
 Super battle droid, from the Star Wars fictional universe